Zou Lihong (born 26 February 1984) is a Paralympic Champion from China competing mainly in category T54 sprint, middle-distance and long-distance events.

Athletic career
Zou made her first senior appearance as a T54 athlete for China in 2010 at track meet in Guangzhou. Her first major international competition was at the 2012 Summer Paralympics in London. She entered four track events winning bronze in the 800 metres middle-distance race. As well as her Paralympic success, Zou has also found success at World Championship level. At the 2015 Doha she medals at all four events she entered, including three golds, in the individual 800 m and 5000m and the 4 × 400 m relay. Zou also enters long-distance events, finishing fifth in the 2016 London Marathon.

Personal history
Zou was born in Dali, China in 1984. During her childhood she contracted polio which resulted in an impairment to her legs.

References

External links 
 

1984 births
Living people
Chinese female sprinters
Chinese female middle-distance runners
Chinese female long-distance runners
Chinese female wheelchair racers
Paralympic athletes of China
Paralympic gold medalists for China
Paralympic bronze medalists for China
Athletes (track and field) at the 2012 Summer Paralympics
Athletes (track and field) at the 2016 Summer Paralympics
Medalists at the 2012 Summer Paralympics
Medalists at the 2016 Summer Paralympics
World Para Athletics Championships winners
People from Dali
Runners from Yunnan
Paralympic medalists in athletics (track and field)
Athletes (track and field) at the 2020 Summer Paralympics
21st-century Chinese women